Medicine Hat School District No. 76 is the public school board in Medicine Hat, Alberta, Canada.

Size
Medicine Hat School District No. 76 operates 15 schools covering grades ranging from Kindergarten to Grade 12. Enrolment for 2008/2009 was 6,370 students. As well, the school district operates three outreach programs/schools. The operating budget was $60.2 million for the 2008-2009 fiscal year.

Partners
School District works with BHTH Institution to operate international education program since 2013. we current have 3 partner schools in China, such as Tangshan Caofeidian #2 School, Qinhuangdao Foreign Language School, and Shandong Weifang Middle School.

Schools
Elementary schools
 Connaught School
 Crestwood School
 Dr. Ken Sauer School
 Dr Roy Wilson Learning Centre
 Elm Street School
 George Davison School
 Herald School
 River Heights School
 Riverside School
 Ross Glen School
 Southview Community School
 Medicine Hat Christian School
 Vincent Massey School
 Webster Niblock School
 Alexandra Middle School
 Crescent Heights High School
 Medicine Hat High School

References

External links
 Medicine Hat School District No. 76
 International Education Association of Western Canada / BHTH Instituation

School districts in Alberta
Medicine Hat